Staburags may refer to:

 Staburags, alternative name of Staburadze, a cliff in Latvia.
 Staburags, official name of extra solar planet HD 118203 b.